Volga in Flames (French: Volga en flammes) is a 1934 historical adventure film directed by Viktor Tourjansky and starring Albert Prejean, Valéry Inkijinoff and Danielle Darrieux. It was made as a co-production between France and Czechoslovakia and is an adaptation of the 1836 novel The Captain's Daughter by Alexander Pushkin, set during the Cossack Rebellion against Catherine the Great.

The film's sets were designed by the art director Andrej Andrejew and Stepán Kopecký. It was shot at the Barrandov Studios in Prague.

Cast

References

Bibliography 
 Jonathan Driskell. The French Screen Goddess: Film Stardom and the Modern Woman in 1930s France. I.B.Tauris, 2015.

External links 
 

1934 films
Czechoslovak adventure films
1930s historical adventure films
French historical adventure films
Czech historical adventure films
1930s French-language films
Films directed by Victor Tourjansky
Films set in the 18th century
Films set in the Russian Empire
Films shot at Barrandov Studios
Films based on works by Aleksandr Pushkin
The Captain's Daughter
Films about rebellions
1930s French films